The name Edwin means "rich friend". It comes from the Old English elements "ead" (rich, blessed) and "ƿine" (friend). The original Anglo-Saxon form is Eadƿine, which is also found for Anglo-Saxon figures.

People

 Edwin of Northumbria (died 632 or 633), King of Northumbria and Christian saint
 Edwin (son of Edward the Elder) (died 933)
 Eadwine of Sussex (died 982), King of Sussex
 Eadwine of Abingdon (died 990), Abbot of Abingdon 
 Edwin, Earl of Mercia (died 1071), brother-in-law of Harold Godwinson (Harold II)
Edwin (director) (born 1978), Indonesian filmmaker
 Edwin (musician) (born 1968), Canadian musician
 Edwin Abeygunasekera, Sri Lankan Sinhala politician, member of the 1st and 2nd State Council of Ceylon
 Edwin Ariyadasa (1922-2021), Sri Lankan Sinhala journalist
 Edwin Austin Abbey (1852–1911) British artist
 Edwin Eugene Aldrin (born 1930), although he changed it to Buzz Aldrin, American astronaut
 Edwin Howard Armstrong (1890–1954), American inventor
 Edwin Batdorf (1853–1927), American colonel
 Edwin Bennett (1818–1908), ceramics industrialist
 Edwin Biedermann (1877–1929), British real tennis player
 Edwin Booth (1833–1893), Shakespearean actor
 Jayawardene Welatantrige Edwin Boteju, Sri Lankan Sinhala Anglican clergyman and legislator
 Edwin H. Brainard (1882–1957), American Marine aviation pioneer
 Edwin Bramall (1923–2019), Chief of the Defence Staff of the British Armed Forces
 Edwin Cassiani (born 1972), Colombian boxer
 Edwin Centeno (1981–2010), Peruvian race walker
 Edwin Chadwick (1800–1890) British social reformer
 Edwin Clarke (1919–1996), British neurologist and medical historian
 Edwin L. Cox, American oilman and philanthropist from Dallas, Texas
 Edwin M. Cronk (1918–2020), American diplomat
 Edwin Davies (1946–2018), British businessman and philanthropist
 Edwin L. Elwood (1847–1907), American soldier
 Edwin Encarnación (born 1983), Dominican baseball player
 Edwin Escobar (born 1992), Venezuelan professional baseball player
 Edwin Henry Fitler (1825-1896), American businessman and politician
 Edwin E. Floyd (1924–1990), American mathematician
 Edwin M. Gardner (1845–1935), American painter
 Edwin Haslam (1932–2013), physical organic chemist and an author of books on polyphenols
 Edwin Loku Bandara Hurulle (1919-2009), Sri Lankan Sinhala diplomat, Provincial Governor
 Edwin N. Hubbell (1815–1897), American politician
 Edwin Hubble (1889–1953), American astronomer for whom the Hubble Telescope is named
 Edwin Jackson (baseball) (born 1983), American baseball player
 Edwin R. Keedy (1880–1958), American Dean of the University of Pennsylvania Law School 
 Sir Edwin Landseer Lutyens (1869–1944), British architect
 Edwin McCain (born 1970), American musician
 Edwin Meese (born 1931), American Attorney General
 Edwin Moses (born 1955), American track and field athlete
 Edwin Mosquera (weightlifter) (1985–2017), Colombian weightlifter
 Edwin Newman (1919–2010), American newscaster and journalist
 Edwin Olivarez (born 1963), Filipino politician
 Edwin Orozco (born 1982), Colombian road cyclist
 Edwin Alfred Rickards (1872–1920), British architect
 Edwin Sandys (bishop) (1519–1588), Archbishop of York
 Edwin Spanier (1921–1996), American mathematician
 Edwin Starr (1942–2003), American soul music singer
 Edwin Thomas, multiple people
 Edwin van der Sar (born 1970), Dutch football player
 Edwin Vurens (born 1968), Dutch football player
 Edwin Walker, multiple people
 Edwin Wijeyeratne (1889–1968), Sri Lankan cabinet minister
 Edwin Bidwell Wilson (1879–1964), American mathematician

Fictional people
 Edwin Jarvis, Marvel Comics supporting character
 Aun (known as Edwin the Old in English), mythical Swedish king
 Edwin Drood, main character in The Mystery of Edwin Drood, final unfinished novel of Charles Dickens
 Edwin, a puppet character who lives in Storybook Land in Pajanimals
 Deputy Edwin Durland, a character in Gravity Falls

Other
Eadwine Psalter illuminated manuscript

See also
 Edwina, the feminine form
 Isiah Edwin Leopold, known as Ed Wynn, 20th-century American comic

References 

Old English given names
English masculine given names
Dutch masculine given names